Kardang is a village in the Lahaul region of Himachal Pradesh, India. It is 5 km away from Keylong. It was once the capital of Lahaul and has the biggest monastery of the area, situated on the left bank of the river Bhaga. The Drukpa Kagyu Kardang Monastery was founded about 900 years ago and was renovated by Lama Norbu in 1912. Gozzangwa Monastery is also nearby.

See also
 Lahaul and Spiti district

References

Villages in Lahaul and Spiti district